Bougna is a traditional feast dish of the Kanak people of New Caledonia. The word "bougna" comes from the Drehu word "puhnya" meaning "bundle", "pack". 

Bougna often contains taro, yam, sweet potato, banana, and pieces of either chicken, fish, crab,  prawns  or lobster. The contents are wrapped in banana leaves and are then buried to cook in a ground oven, which uses red-hot rocks heated by fire.  After about two hours of cooking, the banana leaves are unearthed and unwrapped, and the contents are eaten.

References

New Caledonian cuisine
Earth oven